The 2010 USA Outdoor Track and Field Championships were held at Drake Stadium, Drake University in Des Moines, Iowa on June 23–27, 2010.  In order to boost the visibility of this event, USATF sponsored a member appreciation tent at the event and promoted the entire week as "Membership appreciation week."  Highlights of the meet were televised on ESPN and NBC.

Results

Men track events

Men field events

Women track events

Women field events

References

Morse, Parker (2010-06-26). Patterson, Felix steal the show: USATF Nationals, Day 1 & 2. IAAF. Retrieved on 2011-01-27.
Morse, Parker (2010-06-27). Lowe jumps 2.05m, wins over Iowa: USATF Nationals Day 3. IAAF. Retrieved on 2011-01-27.
Morse, Parker (2010-06-28). Oliver flies 12.93, Suhr soars 4.89m as US champs conclude. IAAF. Retrieved on 2011-01-27.

External links

 Schedule and results 

USA Outdoor Track and Field Championships
Usa Outdoor Track And Field Championships, 2010
Track and field
Usa Outdoor Track And Field Championships
Sports in Des Moines, Iowa
Track and field in Iowa